Badulla is the capital and the largest city of Uva Province situated in the lower central hills of Sri Lanka. It is the capital city of Uva Province and the Badulla District.

Geography

It was a base of a pre-colonial Sinhalese local prince (regional king) who ruled the area under the main King in Kandy before it became part of the British Empire. Later, it became one of the provincial administrative hubs of the British rulers. The city was the terminus of upcountry railway line built by the British in order to take mainly tea plantation products to Colombo.

History and present day

Badulla was an isolated village until the British built roads from Kandy and Nuwara Eliya in the mid 19th century, as part of the growing plantation economy. By the 20th century Badulla had become a regional hub, with the British establishing it as the capital of Uva Wellassa, now known as the Uva Province. Badulla still has a number of British colonial buildings existing, including the Badulla railway station, St Mark's Church and the Old Welekade Market.  Badulla district is one of the leading tea producing districts, second only behind the Nuwara-Eliya District.

The town has grown steadily since the country's independence from approximately 13,000 in 1946, to 38,000 in 1977 and 47,587 in 2011.

Badulla is a multi-national city with the ancient Muthiyangana Temple situated in its heart. The Catholic Church has a diocese headquartered here.

Transport

Road
There are multiple routes to Badulla from Colombo, Kandy and Galle. From Colombo, one can travel via Ratnapura, Balangoda, Haputale, Bandarawela and Hali Ela along A4 and A16 to Badulla, which may take 5–6 hours. From Kandy there are two routes: either via "Victoria-Randenigala Raja Mawatha" or via Nuwara Eliya (route A5). From Galle, the best route is via Matara, Hambantota, Wellawaya, Ella, Demodara and Hali Ela (route A2). All routes are scenic and one can see splendid views of the geography, which changes while travelling. Badulla and its surroundings are highly recommended for eco-tourists as Horton Plains National Park and the Knuckles mountains are a few hours away.

Rail

The line was constructed by the British to transport tea collected from the Badulla district to Colombo.

Tourist attractions
 Muthiyangana temple is an ancient Buddhist temple located in the middle of Badulla. It is regarded as one of the Solosmasthana, the sixteen sacred places in Sri Lanka, believed by Buddhists to have been visited by Gautama Buddha.
 Badulla Kataragama Devalaya is an ancient devalaya, situated in Badulla town. It is one of shrines dedicated to Sinhalese deity Kataragama deviyo.
 Old Welekade Market is a historic colonial building, situated in middle of the Badulla town. It was built in 1889 by British.
This is one of the most popular waterfalls of Sri Lanka, mentioned in several famous songs and works of literature. It draws many local and foreign tourists to the region.
 Demodara railway station is between Ella and Udoowara railway stations. Demodara railway station is famous because the railway turns from the platform, and then goes under the railway station in the tunnel.
 St Mark's Church, built in memory of Major Thomas William Rogers, Assistant Government Agent of Uva Province, who died 7 June 1845 after being  struck by lightning at the Sherwood Estate in Haputale. It was the first church to be consecrated (25 April 1857) by the first Bishop of Colombo Rev. James Chapman.

Demographics

See also
 List of cities in Sri Lanka
 List of Archaeological Protected Monuments in Badulla District

References

External links

 Office of the Governor - Uva / ඌව පලාත් ආණ්ඩුකාරවර කාර්යාලය  
 Provincial General Hospital - Badulla / පළාත් මහ රෝහල - බදුල්ල 
 A school in Badulla District 
 Badulla 
 Detailed map of Badulla vicinity and Sri Lanka

 
Provincial capitals in Sri Lanka
Populated places in Uva Province
Grama Niladhari divisions of Sri Lanka